Sardar-e Bozorg Ab Anbar (Persian: آب انبار سردار بزرگ) is an Ab Anbar in Qazvin, Iran. It is the largest single-domed Ab Anbar (water reservoir) in Iran.

Built in 1812, It is one of the two Ab Anbars built by two brothers named Mohammad Hassan Khan and Mohammad Hossein Khan, the other being Sardar-e Kuchak Ab Anbar. Its 3000 square meter reservoir used to get its water from a Qanat.

References 

Qazvin
Buildings of the Qajar period